The 2014 French F4 Championship season was the 22nd season of the series for 1600cc Formula Renault machinery, and the fourth season to run under the guise of the French F4 Championship. The series began on 26 April at Le Mans and ended on 26 October at Le Castellet, after seven rounds and twenty-one races.

The championship was won by Denmark's Lasse Sørensen, who won eight races – including two hat-tricks at Val de Vienne and Nogaro – and took a total of seventeen podium finishes. Sørensen – who also won the International series due to his performances – finished almost 150 points clear of his next closest rival, Dorian Boccolacci, a member of the Lotus F1 team's junior development setup. Boccolacci, who won two races at the series' event in support of the Pau Grand Prix, had trailed Felix Hirsiger by three points going into the final race at Le Castellet; however, Boccolacci finished third, whereas Hirsiger finished outside the points, in order to give Boccolacci the runner-up spot by twelve points. Boccolacci was also the winner of the junior championship held within the series, for the younger drivers in the series. Hirsiger was also a two-time winner, winning at Magny-Cours.

Six other drivers won races during the season; Australian Joseph Mawson won two races at the opening round at Le Mans, and added a third victory in the series' round at Circuito de Jerez, in support of the World Series by Renault. Mawson had been in contention for the runner-up placing in the championship, but missed the final round and ultimately finished fourth. Denis Bulatov won races at Pau and Magny-Cours, and was the only other driver to win multiple races. Bryan Elpitiya (Le Mans) and Gjergj Haxhiu (Jerez) each won a race, but finished outside the top ten in the final championship standings, while at the final round, Patricio O'Ward and Valentin Moineault each won races. Moineault's victory allowed him to claim sixth in the championship ahead of O'Ward, despite O'Ward missing the first two events of the season.

Driver lineup

Notes

Race calendar and results

Championship standings

F4

† — Drivers did not finish the race, but were classified as they completed over 75% of the race distance.

Junior

International Series

References

External links
 

F4 Championship
French F4